The Turkmenistan women's national handball team is the national team of Turkmenistan. It is governed by the Handball Federation of Turkmenistan and takes part in international handball competitions.

Asian Championship record
 2002 – 6th
 2012 – 10th

External links
IHF profile

Women's national handball teams
Handball
National team